Daykovaya Peak is a prominent peak,  high, rising between Mount Hansen and Kare Bench in the Westliche Petermann Range, Wohlthat Mountains. It was discovered and plotted from air photos by the Third German Antarctic Expedition, 1938–39. It was mapped from air photos and surveys by the Sixth Norwegian Antarctic Expedition, 1956–60; remapped by the Soviet Antarctic Expedition, 1960–61, and named Gora Daykovaya (dike mountain).

References
 

Mountains of Queen Maud Land
Princess Astrid Coast